Waterloo to Anywhere is the debut album by English indie rock band Dirty Pretty Things, fronted by then former Libertine Carl Barât. The album was produced by Dave Sardy and Tony Doogan, and released on 8 May 2006 in the United Kingdom where it debuted at #3 in the UK Albums Chart.

The album was leaked onto the internet in early April 2006. The cover and all artwork for the album was made by artist Hannah Bays.

Track listing
"Deadwood" – 2:28
"Doctors and Dealers" – 3:18
The American edition of the album features this song at track 6.
"Bang Bang You're Dead" – 3:33
"Blood Thirsty Bastards" – 3:11
"The Gentry Cove" – 2:32
"Gin & Milk" – 3:06
The American edition of the album features this song at track 2.
"The Enemy" – 3:36
"If You Love a Woman" – 3:13
"You Fucking Love It" – 1:54
"Wondering" – 2:54
"Last of the Small Town Playboys" – 3:31
"B.U.R.M.A." (UK edition only) – 3:18
Not included on the British LP or the American release.

Japanese edition bonus tracks
"Gin & Milk" (acoustic version)
"Wondering" (tavern version)

Limited edition bonus 7"
A limited edition version of the LP included an additional 7" with the following tracks.
"Bang Bang You’re Dead" (acoustic)
"B.U.R.M.A" – 3:18

Limited edition bonus DVD
A limited edition version of the CD included a DVD directed by Goatie Lewis with five live tracks from their concert at Macadam Building, King's College London, on 8 March 2006.
"The Enemy"
"Blood Thirsty Bastards"
"Gentry Cove"
"Bang Bang You're Dead"
"Last of the Small Town Playboys"

Singles
The lead single from the album, "Bang Bang You're Dead", was released on April 24 and peaked at #4 in the UK Singles Chart. Second single "Deadwood" peaked at #20 upon its release on July 11. The third single from the album, "Wondering" was released on October 15 and peaked at #34 in the charts.

Release details

References

2006 albums
Dirty Pretty Things (band) albums
Mercury Records albums
Interscope Records albums
Vertigo Records albums
Albums produced by Dave Sardy
Albums produced by Tony Doogan